SpaceShip III (SS3, also with Roman numeral III; formerly SpaceShipThree) is an upcoming class of spaceplanes by Virgin Galactic to follow SpaceShipTwo. It was first teased on the Virgin Galactic Twitter account on 25 February 2021 announcing the rollout of the first plane on 30 March 2021.

Concept evolution
The purpose originally proposed for SpaceShipThree in 2005 was for commercial orbital spaceflight, as part of a program called "Tier 2" by Burt Rutan founder of Scaled Composites.

By 2008, Scaled Composites had reduced those plans and articulated a conceptual design that would be a point-to-point vehicle traveling outside the atmosphere. By 2008, the SpaceShipThree concept was to be used for transportation through point-to-point suborbital spaceflight with the spacecraft providing, for example, a two-hour trip on the Kangaroo Route (from London to Sydney or Melbourne).

Scaled was sold to Northrop Grumman in 2007, and references to further work on a conceptual Scaled SS3 ended at some point afterwards from Scaled. Scaled was realigned by Northrop Grumman in 2015 as a research unit. Virgin Galactic acquired full control of The Spaceship Company in 2012, the manufacturer of SS2. The technology was built upon the base technology owned by Mojave Aerospace Ventures of Paul Allen, originally licensed in 2004. Allen died in 2018, subsequent space activities of the Vulcan Group went inactive afterwards.

By 2016, Richard Branson was still planning to have a point-to-point sub-orbital spaceliner follow-up to SpaceShipTwo, for Virgin Galactic and The Spaceship Company.

Revised concept
The current SpaceShip III is designed to provide just a few minutes of weightlessness and views for space tourists for Virgin Galactic, and is a production version of SpaceShipTwo, with improved maintenance and flight rate performance and does not have point to point transportation capabilities as previously envisioned in 2016.

In early 2021, Virgin Galactic teased an upcoming vehicle on their Twitter account with the name shown in stylized font as "SPACESHIP 3".

Development
The first Spaceship III, VSS Imagine, was rolled out on 30 March 2021 and it was indicated there is ground testing to do before glide test flights should commence not earlier than Summer 2021.

List of vehicles

See also 
 Stratolaunch Systems
 Supersonic transport

References

External links 
 Space tourism companies aiming for orbit (New Scientist Space, 8/24/2005)

Spaceplanes
Space tourism
Air launch to orbit
Space access
Scaled Composites
Crewed spacecraft
Reusable launch systems
Rocket-powered aircraft
Experimental vehicles
American spacecraft
Suborbital spaceflight
Vehicles introduced in 2021